Anticonvulsants (also known as antiepileptic drugs or antiseizure drugs) are a diverse group of pharmacological agents used in the treatment of epileptic seizures. Anticonvulsants are also increasingly being used in the treatment of bipolar disorder and borderline personality disorder, since many seem to act as mood stabilizers, and for the treatment of neuropathic pain. Anticonvulsants suppress the excessive rapid firing of neurons during seizures. Anticonvulsants also prevent the spread of the seizure within the brain.

Conventional antiepileptic drugs may block sodium channels or enhance γ-aminobutyric acid (GABA) function. Several antiepileptic drugs have multiple or uncertain mechanisms of action. Next to the voltage-gated sodium channels and components of the GABA system, their targets include GABAA receptors, the GAT-1 GABA transporter, and GABA transaminase. Additional targets include voltage-gated calcium channels, SV2A, and α2δ. By blocking sodium or calcium channels, antiepileptic drugs reduce the release of excitatory glutamate, whose release is considered to be elevated in epilepsy, but also that of GABA. This is probably a side effect or even the actual mechanism of action for some antiepileptic drugs, since GABA can itself, directly or indirectly, act proconvulsively. Another potential target of antiepileptic drugs is the peroxisome proliferator-activated receptor alpha.

Some anticonvulsants have shown antiepileptogenic effects in animal models of epilepsy. That is, they either prevent the development of epilepsy or can halt or reverse the progression of epilepsy. However, no drug has been shown in human trials to prevent epileptogenesis (the development of epilepsy in an individual at risk, such as after a head injury).

Terminology
Anticonvulsants are more accurately called antiepileptic drugs (abbreviated "AEDs"), and are often referred to as antiseizure drugs because they provide symptomatic treatment only and have not been demonstrated to alter the course of epilepsy.

Approval

The usual method of achieving approval for a drug is to show it is effective when compared against placebo, or that it is more effective than an existing drug. In monotherapy (where only one drug is taken) it is considered unethical by most to conduct a trial with placebo on a new drug of uncertain efficacy. This is because untreated epilepsy leaves the patient at significant risk of death. Therefore, almost all new epilepsy drugs are initially approved only as adjunctive (add-on) therapies. Patients whose epilepsy is uncontrolled by their medication (i.e., it is refractory to treatment) are selected to see if supplementing the medication with the new drug leads to an improvement in seizure control. Any reduction in the frequency of seizures is compared against a placebo. The lack of superiority over existing treatment, combined with lacking placebo-controlled trials, means that few modern drugs have earned FDA approval as initial monotherapy. In contrast, Europe only requires equivalence to existing treatments and has approved many more. Despite their lack of FDA approval, the American Academy of Neurology and the American Epilepsy Society still recommend a number of these new drugs as initial monotherapy.

Drugs
In the following list, the dates in parentheses are the earliest approved use of the drug.

Aldehydes

 Paraldehyde (1882). One of the earliest anticonvulsants. It is still used to treat status epilepticus, particularly where there are no resuscitation facilities.

Aromatic allylic alcohols
 Stiripentol (2007). Indicated for the treatment of Dravet syndrome.

Barbiturates

Barbiturates are drugs that act as central nervous system (CNS) depressants, and by virtue of this they produce a wide spectrum of effects, from mild sedation to anesthesia. The following are classified as anticonvulsants:
 Phenobarbital (1912). See also the related drug primidone.
 Methylphenobarbital (1935). Known as mephobarbital in the US. No longer marketed in the UK.
 Barbexaclone (1982). Only available in some European countries.

Phenobarbital was the main anticonvulsant from 1912 until the development of phenytoin in 1938. Today, phenobarbital is rarely used to treat epilepsy in new patients since there are other effective drugs that are less sedating. Phenobarbital sodium injection can be used to stop acute convulsions or status epilepticus, but a benzodiazepine such as lorazepam, diazepam or midazolam is usually tried first. Other barbiturates only have an anticonvulsant effect at anaesthetic doses.

Benzodiazepines

The benzodiazepines are a class of drugs with hypnotic, anxiolytic, anticonvulsive, amnestic and muscle relaxant properties. Benzodiazepines act as a central nervous system depressant. The relative strength of each of these properties in any given benzodiazepine varies greatly and influences the indications for which it is prescribed. Long-term use can be problematic due to the development of tolerance to the anticonvulsant effects and dependency. Of many drugs in this class, only a few are used to treat epilepsy:
 Clobazam (1979). Notably, used on a short-term basis around menstruation in women with catamenial epilepsy.
 Clonazepam (1974).
 Clorazepate (1972).

The following benzodiazepines are used to treat status epilepticus:
 Diazepam (1963). Can be given rectally by trained care-givers.
 Midazolam (N/A). Increasingly being used as an alternative to diazepam. This water-soluble drug is squirted into the side of the mouth but not swallowed. It is rapidly absorbed by the buccal mucosa.
 Lorazepam (1972). Given by injection in hospital.

Nitrazepam, temazepam, and especially nimetazepam are powerful anticonvulsant agents, however their use is rare due to an increased incidence of side effects and strong sedative and motor-impairing properties.

Bromides

 Potassium bromide (1857). The earliest effective treatment for epilepsy. There would not be a better drug until phenobarbital in 1912. It is still used as an anticonvulsant for dogs and cats but is no longer used in humans.

Carbamates

 Felbamate (1993). This effective anticonvulsant has had its usage severely restricted due to rare but life-threatening side effects.
 Cenobamate (2019).

Carboxamides

The following are carboxamides:
 Carbamazepine (1963). A popular anticonvulsant that is available in generic formulations.
 Oxcarbazepine (1990). A derivative of carbamazepine that has similar efficacy and is better tolerated and is also available generically.
 Eslicarbazepine acetate (2009).

Fatty acids

The following are fatty-acids:
 The valproates — valproic acid, sodium valproate, and divalproex sodium (1967).
 Vigabatrin (1989).
 Progabide (1987).
 Tiagabine (1996).

Vigabatrin and progabide are also analogs of GABA.

Fructose derivatives

 Topiramate (1995).

Gabapentinoids

Gabapentinoids are used in, epilepsy, neuropathic pain, fibromyalgia, restless leg syndrome, opioid withdrawal and generalized anxiety disorder (GAD). Gabapentinoids block Voltage gated Calcium channels, mainly the N-Type, and P/Q type calcium channels. The following are Gabapentinoids:
 Pregabalin (2004)
 Mirogabalin (2019) (Japan only)
 Gabapentin (1993)
 Gabapentin Encarbil (2011).
 Gabapentin Extended Release (Gralise)  (1996).

Gabapentinoids are analogs of GABA, but they do not act on GABA. They have analgesic anticonvulsant and anxiolytic effects.

Hydantoins

The following are hydantoins:
 Ethotoin (1957).
 Phenytoin (1938).
 Mephenytoin.
 Fosphenytoin (1996).

Oxazolidinediones

The following are oxazolidinediones:
 Paramethadione.
 Trimethadione (1946).
 Ethadione.

Propionates

 Beclamide.

Pyrimidinediones

 Primidone (1952).

Pyrrolidines

 Brivaracetam (2016).
 Etiracetam.
 Levetiracetam (1999).
 Seletracetam.

Succinimides

The following are succinimides:
 Ethosuximide (1955).
 Phensuximide.
 Mesuximide.

Sulfonamides 

 Acetazolamide (1953).
 Sultiame.
 Methazolamide.
 Zonisamide (2000).

Triazines

 Lamotrigine (1990).

Ureas

 Pheneturide.
 Phenacemide.

Valproylamides

 Valpromide.
 Valnoctamide.

Other
 Perampanel.
 Stiripentol.
 Pyridoxine (1939).

Treatment guidelines
According to guidelines by the American Academy of Neurology and American Epilepsy Society, mainly based on a major article review in 2004, patients with newly diagnosed epilepsy who require treatment can be initiated on standard anticonvulsants such as carbamazepine, phenytoin, valproic acid/valproate semisodium, phenobarbital, or on the newer anticonvulsants gabapentin, lamotrigine, oxcarbazepine or topiramate. The choice of anticonvulsants depends on individual patient characteristics. Both newer and older drugs are generally equally effective in new onset epilepsy. The newer drugs tend to have fewer side effects. For newly diagnosed partial or mixed seizures, there is evidence for using gabapentin, lamotrigine, oxcarbazepine or topiramate as monotherapy. Lamotrigine can be included in the options for children with newly diagnosed absence seizures.

History
The first anticonvulsant was bromide, suggested in 1857 by the British gynecologist Charles Locock who used it to treat women with "hysterical epilepsy" (probably catamenial epilepsy). Bromides are effective against epilepsy, and also cause impotence, which is not related to its anti-epileptic effects. Bromide also suffered from the way it affected behaviour, introducing the idea of the "epileptic personality" which was actually a result of medication. Phenobarbital was first used in 1912 for both its sedative and antiepileptic properties. By the 1930s, the development of animal models in epilepsy research led to the development of phenytoin by Tracy Putnam and H. Houston Merritt, which had the distinct advantage of treating epileptic seizures with less sedation. By the 1970s, a National Institutes of Health initiative, the Anticonvulsant Screening Program, headed by J. Kiffin Penry, served as a mechanism for drawing the interest and abilities of pharmaceutical companies in the development of new anticonvulsant medications.

Marketing approval history

The following table lists anticonvulsant drugs together with the date their marketing was approved in the US, UK and France. Data for the UK and France are incomplete. The European Medicines Agency approves drugs throughout the European Union. Some of the drugs are no longer marketed.

Pregnancy
During pregnancy, the metabolism of several anticonvulsants is affected. There may be an increase in the clearance and resultant decrease in the blood concentration of lamotrigine, phenytoin, and to a lesser extent carbamazepine, and possibly decreases the level of levetiracetam and the active oxcarbazepine metabolite, the monohydroxy derivative. Therefore, these drugs should be monitored during use in pregnancy.

Many of the common used medications, such as valproate, phenytoin, carbamazepine, phenobarbitol, gabapentin have been reported to cause increased risk of birth defects. Among anticonvulsants, levetiracetam and lamotrigine seem to carry the lowest risk of causing birth defects. The risk of untreated epilepsy is believed to be greater than the risk of adverse effects caused by these medications, necessitating continuation of antiepileptic treatment.

Valproic acid, and its derivatives such as sodium valproate and divalproex sodium, causes cognitive deficit in the child, with an increased dose causing decreased intelligence quotient. On the other hand, evidence is conflicting for carbamazepine regarding any increased risk of congenital physical anomalies or neurodevelopmental disorders by intrauterine exposure. Similarly, children exposed lamotrigine or phenytoin in the womb do not seem to differ in their skills compared to those who were exposed to carbamazepine.

There is inadequate evidence to determine if newborns of women with epilepsy taking anticonvulsants have a substantially increased risk of hemorrhagic disease of the newborn.

Regarding breastfeeding, some anticonvulsants probably pass into breast milk in clinically significant amounts, including primidone and levetiracetam. On the other hand, valproate, phenobarbital, phenytoin, and carbamazepine probably are not transferred into breast milk in clinically important amounts.

Data from studies conducted on women taking antiepileptic drugs for non-epileptic reasons, including depression and bipolar disorder, show that if high doses of the drugs are taken during the first trimester of pregnancy then there is the potential of an increased risk of congenital malformations.

Pregnancy planning is being explored as a method that could decrease the risk of possible birth defects. Since the first trimester is the most susceptible period for fetal development, planning a routine antiepileptic drug dose that is safer for the first trimester could be beneficial to prevent pregnancy complications.

In animal models, several anticonvulsant drugs have been demonstrated to induce neuronal apoptosis in the developing brain.

References

Further reading
 Anti epileptic activity of novel substituted fluorothiazole derivatives by Devid Chutia, RGUHS

External links
 Drug Reference for FDA Approved Epilepsy Drugs

 
Epilepsy